Bijou Basin was a settlement in northern El Paso County, Colorado near Elbert County, Colorado, where there was a train station. Travelers could also take post road 49. It was located five miles southeast of another early settlement, Sidney.

A rural post office was established at Bijou Basin in 1869. Settlers established sheep and cattle ranches. The post office closed in 1907.

See also
 List of ghost towns in Colorado

References

Former populated places in El Paso County, Colorado
Former populated places in Colorado